Roseline Filion (born July 3, 1987) is a retired Canadian diver. She used to compete in the 10 m synchronized event with Meaghan Benfeito. Filion has twice won an Olympic bronze medal in the 10 m platform synchro event: at the 2012 Summer Olympics in London and the 2016 Summer Olympics in Rio de Janeiro. She has also won a bronze at the World Aquatics Championships and Commonwealth Games. She retired in January 2017.

Career
She won a bronze medal at the 2005 World Aquatics Championships, but she and Benfeito have been unable to return to the medal podium at the Worlds since.  In 2006, they won a bronze at the Commonwealth Games. At the 2008 Summer Olympics, they finished in 7th place.  She won the bronze medal in the 10 m platform synchro at the 2012 Summer Olympics in London with her partner of seven years, Benfeito. After winning the medal Filion commented that "We're on top of the world right now. We've waited so long for this medal, we've worked so hard. Beijing was a little disappointing but we came back strong, more mature, ready and in top shape, and we just dived with our hearts today."

Personal
Benfeito is considered a lifelong friend of Filion. She says that "We've known one another for our entire lives, so we have a really good relationship. It's more of a sisterhood relationship now. We could probably go to a restaurant and order for each other."

She took up diving after watching Annie Pelletier win a medal at the Atlanta Olympics.

References

External links
Diving Plongeon Canada

1987 births
Living people
French Quebecers
Olympic divers of Canada
Sportspeople from Laval, Quebec
Divers at the 2008 Summer Olympics
Divers at the 2011 Pan American Games
Divers at the 2012 Summer Olympics
Divers at the 2016 Summer Olympics
Canadian female divers
Olympic medalists in diving
Olympic bronze medalists for Canada
Medalists at the 2012 Summer Olympics
Medalists at the 2016 Summer Olympics
Commonwealth Games gold medallists for Canada
Divers at the 2006 Commonwealth Games
Divers at the 2010 Commonwealth Games
Divers at the 2014 Commonwealth Games
Divers at the 2015 Pan American Games
World Aquatics Championships medalists in diving
Commonwealth Games bronze medallists for Canada
Pan American Games gold medalists for Canada
Pan American Games silver medalists for Canada
Commonwealth Games medallists in diving
Pan American Games medalists in diving
Medalists at the 2011 Pan American Games
Medalists at the 2015 Pan American Games
20th-century Canadian women
21st-century Canadian women
Medallists at the 2006 Commonwealth Games
Medallists at the 2014 Commonwealth Games